Kåre Kongsvik (10 April 1902 – 12 November 1982) was a Norwegian footballer. He played in three matches for the Norway national football team from 1929 to 1930.

References

External links
 

1902 births
1982 deaths
Norwegian footballers
Norway international footballers
Place of birth missing
Association footballers not categorized by position